The Madison County Courthouse is a building located in Rexburg, Idaho listed on the National Register of Historic Places.

The Beaux Arts design of the courthouse is "ambitious and elaborate" for architect C.A. Sundberg, who went on to design a number of other county courthouses in Idaho.

See also

 List of National Historic Landmarks in Idaho
 National Register of Historic Places listings in Madison County, Idaho

References

1920 establishments in Idaho
Buildings and structures in Madison County, Idaho
Courthouses on the National Register of Historic Places in Idaho
Government buildings completed in 1920
National Register of Historic Places in Madison County, Idaho
Beaux-Arts architecture in Idaho